Sainte-Suzanne is a commune in the Trou-du-Nord Arrondissement, in the Nord-Est department of Haiti. It has 21,617 inhabitants.

Communal Sections 
The commune consists of six communal sections, namely:
 Foulon, rural
 Bois Blanc, urban and rural, containing part of the town of Sainte Suzanne
 Cotelette, rural
 Sarazin, urban and rural, containing part of the town of Sainte Suzanne
 Moka Neuf, rural
 Fond Bleu, urban and rural, containing the Quartier de Dupity

References

Populated places in Nord-Est (department)
Communes of Haiti